Secret Green is a British rock band, founded in 2007, by Francis Lickerish, Hilary Palmer and Jon Beedle. Recent additions to the band William Gilmour and Matt Hodge complete the line-up. Additional musicians Paul Carr, Dave Brooks, Jamie Brooks, Brian Mitchell and Mike Hicks are employed for live work.

Guitarist, lutenist and composer Francis Lickerish is a founder member of cult band The Enid. Along with Robert John Godfrey and William Gilmour, he was one of the main contributors to The Enid's sound. He has also appeared as a session musician in several unexpected places, such as Kim Wilde’s "Kids in America", and on former Incredible String Band member Malcolm LeMaistre’s solo album.

After a 20 year break from music, Lickerish began writing Secret Green’s To Wake the King album in 2006, which was released in May 2009.

Discography

Albums
To Wake The King (2009) - Holyground (HG137)
Far and Forgot - From the Lost Lands (2012) - Secret Green (SG1)

References

External links
 Secret Green's Website 
 Secret Green on Last.fm

British rock music groups